Count of Penaguião (in Portuguese Conde de Penaguião) is a Portuguese title of nobility, created by King Philip I of Portugal, on 10 February 1583, for Dom João Rodrigues de Sá.

The noble family of Sá were elevated as Marquises of Fontes in 1659.

By Royal Decree of King John V of Portugal on 24 June 1718, the 3rd Marquis of Fontes, a celebrated military commander and ambassador, received a grant of land from the Crown and was conferred the additional distinguished marquisate of Abrantes; the Letters Patent also granted him the additional ancient arms and name of Almeida and stipulated the countship of Penaguião devolve upon the Marquis' heir apparent de jure.

List of the Counts of Penaguião (1583)
João Rodrigues de Sá (c.1555- ? );
Francisco de Sá de Menezes (1598-1647), his son;
João Rodrigues de Sá e Menezes (1619-1658), his son;
Francisco de Sá e Menezes (c.1640-1677), his son, also 1st Marquis of Fontes;
João Rodrigo de Sá e Menezes, his son;
João Rodrigues de Sá Menezes (1674-1688), his brother, also 2nd Marquis of Fontes;
Rodrigo Anes de Sá Almeida e Menezes (1676-1733), his younger brother, also 3rd Marquis of Fontes, later 1st Marquis of Abrantes;
Joaquim Francisco de Sá Almeida e Menezes (1695-1756), his son, also 2nd Marquis of Abrantes;
Ana Maria Catarina Henriqueta de Lorena (1691-1761), his sister, also 3rd Marchioness and Duchess of Abrantes for life;
Maria Margarida de Lorena (1713-1780), her daughter, also 4th Marchioness and Duchess of Abrantes for life;
José Maria de Lancastre e Távora de Almeida Sá e Menezes (1742-1771), his 2nd cousin, also 6th Count of Vila Nova de Portimão;
Pedro de Lancastre da Silveira de Castelo-Branco Sá e Menezes (1762-1828), his son, also 5th Marquis of Abrantes and 7th Count of Vila Nova de Portimão;
José Maria da Piedade de Lancastre (1784-1827), his son, also 6th Marquis of Abrantes and 8th Count of Vila Nova de Portimão;
Pedro Maria da Piedade de Lancastre Almeida Sá Menezes (1816-1847), his son, also 7th Marquis of Abrantes and 9th Count of Vila Nova de Portimão;
João Maria da Piedade de Lancastre e Távora (1864-1917), his nephew, also 8th Marquis of Abrantes and 11th Count of Vila Nova de Portimão;
José Maria da Piedade de Lancastre e Távora (1887-1961), his son, also 9th Marquis of Abrantes and 12th Count of Vila Nova de Portimão;
Luis Gonzaga de Lancastre e Távora (1937-1993), his son, also 10th Marquis of Abrantes and 13th Count of Vila Nova de Portimão;
José Maria da Piedade de Lancastre e Távora (born 1960), his son, the 11th and present Marquis of Abrantes, also 14th Count of Vila Nova de Portimão.

See also
House of Abrantes
Marquis of Abrantes
Count of Vila Nova de Portimão
List of countships in Portugal

Bibliography
”Nobreza de Portugal e do Brasil" – Vol. III, pages 112/113. Published by Zairol Lda., Lisbon 1989.

Penaguiao
Santa Marta de Penaguião
1583 establishments in Portugal